The 1973–74 season saw Rochdale compete for their 5th consecutive season in the Football League Third Division. They finished in 24th and last position and were relegated into the Football League Fourth Division

Statistics
																								
																								

|}

Final League Table

Competitions

Football League Third Division

F.A. Cup

League Cup

Lancashire Cup

References

Rochdale A.F.C. seasons
Rochdale